NFL Football Pro 99 is a sports game developed and published by Sierra On-Line for Microsoft Windows in 1998.

Development, release, and recall
Sierra announced that it was retiring the Front Page Sports logo while upgrading graphics with an all-new 3D engine (at the time it was developed). The game was eventually released on December 22, 1998. However, due to a number of complaints addressing too many flaws, glitches, and bugs in the system, the game was recalled on January 20, 1999. Sierra president David Grenewetzki released the following statement:

Sierra also stated that it would do a better job starting with the release of NFL Football Pro 2000 in 1999. However, said game was eventually cancelled in February 1999.

Reception
PC Accelerator gave the game a score of zero, calling it "the worst piece of sports software we have ever seen in a shrink-wrapped box. It should never have left the building, and the decision to send it out to stores will stick with Sierra Sports for the next few years. And deservedly so."

References

1998 video games
National Football League video games
North America-exclusive video games
Sierra Entertainment games
Video games set in 1999
Windows games
Windows-only games
Video games developed in the United States